Aleksandr Vladimirovich Budakov (born 10 February 1985) is a Russian former professional football goalkeeper.

Club career
He made his professional debut in the Russian Second Division in 2006 for FC Chernomorets Novorossiysk.

Match fixing
In August 2016, Budakov was one of several Isloch Minsk Raion players alleged to be involved in match fixing during their match with Dinamo Brest on 30 April 2016.

Honours 
 Russian First Division best goalkeeper: 2010.

Career statistics

Club

Notes

References

External links
 
 

1985 births
People from Magnitogorsk
Living people
Russian footballers
Russia youth international footballers
Russia national football B team footballers
Russian expatriate footballers
Expatriate footballers in Belarus
FC Chernomorets Novorossiysk players
PFC Krylia Sovetov Samara players
FC Sibir Novosibirsk players
Association football goalkeepers
FC Kuban Krasnodar players
Russian Premier League players
PFC Spartak Nalchik players
FC Khimki players
FC Vityaz Podolsk players
FC Torpedo Moscow players
FC Isloch Minsk Raion players
FC Amkar Perm players
FC Anzhi Makhachkala players
FC Lokomotiv Moscow players
Sportspeople from Chelyabinsk Oblast